Kürdlər (also, Kyurdlyar) is a village and municipality in the Aghjabadi Rayon of Azerbaijan.  It has a population of 891.

References 

Populated places in Aghjabadi District